The Prisons (Property) Act 2013 (c. 11) is an Act of the Parliament of the United Kingdom which will make provision for the destruction of certain property found in prisons and similar institutions.

References

United Kingdom Acts of Parliament 2013